Etrag, short for Entreprise Publique Economique des Tracteurs Agricoles  (EPE/ETRAG/Spa), is a company specialized in the development of agricultural machinery. It was created on June 29, 2009 following the split of the EPE CMT.

Partnership
Etrag concluded an industrial and commercial partnership with AGCO Massey Ferguson, world leader in the manufacture of agricultural machinery. They created on 16 August 2012 a joint venture (joint venture) called Algerian Tractors Company ATC Spa. The agreement consisted of two local partners ETRAG with (36%), Pmat with (15%)and Massey Ferguson with (41%).

Products
Since 1974 more than 112 000 farm tractors were manufactured in Etrag factories, when it was under the label Sonacome.

Obsolete Models 
Cirta C4006 From 1974 until 1983.
Cirta C6006 From 1974 until 2003.
Cirta CT900 From 1974 until 2003
Cirta CX3.70 From 2003 until 2010
Cirta CX 100 From 2001 until 2013 (first generation).

Actual Models 
Cirta C6807 Since 1998.

References

Economy of Constantine, Algeria
Manufacturing companies established in 2009
Companies based in Constantine, Algeria
Government-owned companies of Algeria
Algerian brands
2009 establishments in Algeria